Jundee Airport  is located  south of Jundee Gold Mine, in the Mid West region of Western Australia.

The airport is serviced by Skippers Aviation charter flights from Perth Airport for the Jundee Gold Mine.

See also
 List of airports in Western Australia
 Aviation transport in Australia

References

External links
 Airservices Aerodromes & Procedure Charts

Airports in Western Australia
Mid West (Western Australia)